Canzoni is the twenty-seventh album released by Lucio Dalla. It was issued in 1996 by Pressing Recrds and distributed by BMG Ricordi.
The release of the album was anticipated by the single "Canzone", written by Dalla with Samuele Bersani. The album has reached the 1st place in the Italian charts with over 1,300,000 copies sold.

Track listing
 Ayrton – 4:26 (Paolo Montevecchi)
 Canzone – 4:29 (Samuele Bersani, Lucio Dalla)
 Tu non mi basti mai – 4:30 (Lucio Dalla, Tullio Ferro)
 Domani – 5:04 (Lucio Dalla, Laurex)
 Ballando ballando – 4:17 (Lucio Dalla, Mauro Malavasi, Robert Sidoli, Angelo Messini)
 Sul mondo – 4:53 (Gian Luigi Fortuzzi, Leo Z)
 Amici – 4:51 (Lucio Dalla, Gianfranco Reverberi, Sergio Bardotti)
 Prendimi così – 4:13 (Lucio Dalla, Gabriel Zagni)
 Nun parlà – 3:52 (Lucio Dalla)
 Cosa vuol dire una lacrima – 3:45 (Lucio Dalla)
 Goodbye – 4:30 (Lucio Dalla)
 Disperato erotico stomp – 5:07 (Lucio Dalla) – Traccia nascosta
 Vieni, spirito di Cristo – 2:13 – Traccia nascosta

Personnel
Lucio Dalla – keyboards, clarinet, vocals
Mauro Malavasi – keyboards, programming, backing vocals
Naco – percussion
Paolo Marini – percussion
Leo Z – keyboards
Roberto Costa – bass
Giovanni Pezzoli – drums
Bruno Mariani – guitar
Ricky Portera – guitar
Daniele Zanini – guitar
Luca Buconi – violin
Luca Ronconi - violin
Tullio Ferro – whistle
Simone Bartolini – French horn
Andrea Sandri, Francesco Yago Felleti, Iskra Menarini, Riccardo Majorana – backing vocals

References

1996 albums